Paul Gibbs (born 3 July 1965) is a New Zealand cricketer. He played in three first-class and six List A matches for Central Districts from 1990 to 1992.

See also
 List of Central Districts representative cricketers

References

External links
 

1965 births
Living people
New Zealand cricketers
Central Districts cricketers
People from Marton, New Zealand